The Nomura Trust & Banking Co., Ltd. (野村信託銀行株式会社, Nomura Shintaku Ginkō Kabushiki Gaisha), founded in 1993, is a Japanese bank that provides provides both trust and banking services. It has over ¥50,000 million in capitalization.

It is part of the Nomura Group and is a wholly owned subsidiary of Nomura Holdings, Inc.

References

External links
Company website (in Japanese)

Banks of Japan
Nomura Holdings
Financial services companies based in Tokyo
Banks established in 1993
Trust banks of Japan
Japanese companies established in 1993